Julen Aguinagalde Akizu; born 8 December 1982) is a Spanish handballer for Bidasoa.

References

External links

 
 
 

1982 births
Living people
Sportspeople from Irun
Spanish male handball players
Liga ASOBAL players
CB Ademar León players
BM Ciudad Real players
Olympic handball players of Spain
Handball players at the 2012 Summer Olympics
Expatriate handball players in Poland
Spanish expatriate sportspeople in Poland
Vive Kielce players
Handball players from the Basque Country (autonomous community)
Handball players at the 2020 Summer Olympics
Medalists at the 2020 Summer Olympics
Olympic bronze medalists for Spain
Olympic medalists in handball